Escape to the Country is a British daytime television reality property-buying/real estate programme first broadcast on 14 October 2002, produced by John Comerford for Talkback Thames, with episodes first broadcast  on network BBC One and repeated on BBC Two. It is syndicated internationally. Production was later transferred to Boundless Productions, a division of Fremantle Media.

Format
The programme's TV format follows potential home buyers as they look for their dream home in the rural UK by viewing three houses (including a "mystery property") in the designated area.  After they inspect each house, the host asks the buyers to guess the seller's asking price before revealing it. Episodes also feature information regarding the counties, towns and villages presented, for example local industry and history.  In each episode, with the exception of some filmed under COVID19 restrictions, the buyers undertake an activity in the local area, often tailored to their interests, such as baking, gardening, or sailing. The presenter also experiences an activity, which is often associated the area in question, such as cheese making. At the end of each episode, the buyers are asked whether they will make an offer on one of the houses, with updates sometimes available at the end of the episode.

Broadcast
There are two versions of each episode produced - a shorter 45-minute version with only 3 houses shown and a longer 60-minute version. The short version usually airs on BBC One weekday afternoons (usually in the 15:00 slot) and the longer on BBC One weekdays at 10:00 or BBC Two evenings at 19:00. Repeat episodes are shown on HGTV.

Series 1 to 5
Produced by Boundless, part of Fremantle UK, and aired from 2002, the premise of the show is that a person/family wishes to relocate from their current city home to a more peaceful and rural retreat. It is then the job of the show's presenter to find four houses for the family to view via laptop computer in their own homes. The family must then choose two out of the four houses to go and view for themselves. In addition, there is also the option of choosing the presenter's 'mystery house'.

Series 3 included a Catherine Gee episode starring actor/writer Ian Murphy, who was relocating from Nottingham to Lancaster.

Series 6 to 9
The format of the show changed in series 6 to accommodate viewer demand to see more houses and more local information . Contributors now view all four houses, of which the fourth is the mystery house. The mystery house usually has something unique about it that will either make the contributors fall in love with or hate it. Added to the show is a taster day in which the contributors sample local delights, gain historical knowledge and visit local attractions to get a feel for the area they are planning to move to. Series 6 aired in August 2007 on BBC One, while series 7 and 8 aired back-to-back in autumn 2008. Series 9 began on 23 February in a new slot of 15:45 on BBC Two.

Series 10 to 12
The format was modified again: the number of properties the couples viewed was reduced to three, with the third being the mystery house. Series 12 consisted of 75 shows and was broadcast from November 2011 on BBC Two with new title and credit sequences.

Series 13 to 20
Series 13 premiered on 3 September 2012 on BBC One, followed by a further series each year; Series 20 began in late 2019.

In 2019, Series 19 was being broadcast and BBC One was re-running episodes of Series 18 on a daily basis. Presenters for these series included Sonali Shah, Jonnie Irwin, Ginny Buckley, Jules Hudson, Alistair Appleton, Margherita Taylor, and Nicki Chapman. For Series 19 the following credits were provided:
 Series Producers: Eleanor Brocklehurst and Emma Smith
 Executive Producer: John Comerford
 Production company: FremantleMedia (Boundless Productions)

Presenters

Over the years, presenters have included:

Catherine Gee (2002–2007)
Nick Page (2002)
Alistair Appleton (2007–2022) 
Jules Hudson (2007–) 
Melissa Porter (2007)
Denise Nurse (2008–2015, 2022-)
Nicki Chapman (2009–)
Jonnie Irwin (2010–)
Aled Jones (2009–2013)
Anita Rani (2014–2015)
Sonali Shah (2014–)
Nicki Shields (2013–2014) 
Ginny Buckley (2015–)
Margherita Taylor (2016–)
Tim Vincent (2008–2009)
Steve Brown (2019–)
Briony May Williams (2022–)
Chris Bavin (2022–)

Spin-off and related shows
A subsequent programme, I Escaped to the Country, revisits potential buyers who had appeared on the primary series. By 2022, seven series of this programme had been shown. 

A related series featuring the same concept and some of the same presenters, but filmed in other countries, Escape to the Continent was made for the BBC by Boundless Productions; two series were filmed.   

From 2019 the BBC showed a spinoff series, Escape To the Perfect Town, about towns and cities instead of rural villages.

A further related series, Greatest Escapes to the Country, looking back at homes featured in the primary series was broadcast on BBC Two in 2020.

Australian version
Escape from the City is an Australian version of the show produced by Fremantle Media Australia and screening on the ABC from 3 January 2019. It is presented by: Jane Hall, Simon Marnie, Bryce Holdaway, Del Irani and Dean Ipaviz.

International broadcasts
In Australia, Escape to the Country airs on Seven Network's free-to-air digital channel 7TWO, and the Lifestyle Channel on Foxtel Subscription TV.

In Canada, it is seen on CTV Life Channel as well as CBC. In Sweden, it airs on TV8.

In the Netherlands, Escape to the Country has been broadcast since April 2011 on SBS 6, and is available on BBC channels distributed by cable operators. It is mentioned in the novel The Detour by Dutch author Gerbrand Bakker.

In the United States, it was available on the Netflix online streaming service in 2017, but was since discontinued. As of March 2020 a limited number of episodes were available for streaming on Amazon Prime Video, in conjunction with IMDbTV. On Dabl, two episodes are broadcast weekday afternoons and rerun the same evening.

DVD releases
On March 5 March 2014, two DVDs were released in Australia by Shock Entertainment. Titled Series 20 Parts 1 & 2, the two DVDs box sets had a total of 19 discs.

References

External links

2002 British television series debuts
2000s British television series
2010s British television series
2020s British television series
BBC Television shows
British reality television series
English-language television shows
Property buying television shows
Television series by Fremantle (company)